Tarsus Old Mosque is a mosque converted from a historic church located in Tarsus ilçe of Mersin Province, southern Turkey.

Geography
The mosque is in the urban fabric of Tarsus. It is on the main road of Tarsus.

History
The mosque was built as a church. The name of the church was probably "Saint Paul Cathedral" honoring Paul the Apostle, who was a resident of Tarsus. (not to be confused with Saint Paul's Church, Tarsus). It was built in 1102, during the late Byzantine period when the city was captured by the First Crusade from the Seljuk Turks. Later when the Armenian principality was issued from the Byzantine Empire,  Leon I was crowned as the Armenian Kingdom of Cilicia in 1198 by Conrad von Wittelsbach in this cathedral.

In 1359, Tarsus fell to Ramazanids, a Turkmen dynasty, and in 1415 Ahmet of Ramazanids (reigned 1383-1416) converted the church into a mosque.

The building

There are blind arches in the facade of the mosque. The main gate is to the west. There are two plaster half columns in the entrance, and also half columns on the  southern and northern walls of the nave, which are made of granite, and thought to have been constructed with the gathered material of the former buildings. On the ceiling, Jesus and four of his apostles are depicted in frescoes. There is a belfry in the northeast corner of the building.

References 

History of Mersin Province
Tarsus, Mersin
Mosques converted from churches in the Ottoman Empire
Mosques in Turkey